Mashinostroitel is a rural locality (a settlement) in Nagornoye Rural Settlement, Petushinsky District, Vladimir Oblast, Russia. The population was 72 as of 2010.

Geography 
Mashinostroitel is located 21 km west of Petushki (the district's administrative centre) by road. Ivanovo is the nearest rural locality.

References 

Rural localities in Petushinsky District